Larry Monroe may refer to:

 Larry Monroe (baseball) (born 1956), an American professional baseball pitcher who played for the Chicago White Sox
 Larry Monroe (radio personality) (1942–2014), an American radio personality who was active in Austin, Texas

See also 
 Larry Monroe Boyle (1943–2017), a Justice of the Idaho Supreme Court from 1989 to 1992
 Larry Monroe Forever Bridge, a bridge in Austin, Texas dedicated to the radio personality